George Hofstetter is an American computer programmer and campaigner for Black rights who has been active since 2013.

Career 

In 2013, at age of 13, Hofstetter competed in the Qeyno Labs Hackathon in Oakland, California, where he and his group developed a social network called "Connect the Dots," creating a space for Black students in private white schools to share their experiences with one another. His team finished third at the hackathon.

The following year's Qeyno Labs Hackathon was sponsored by ESSENCE and Qeyno Labs in New Orleans and was after the launch of YesWeCode, an initiative started by Prince and Van Jones after the murder of Trayvon Martin with the goal of helping 100,000 young women and men from underrepresented backgrounds to be successful in the tech sector. He and his team developed an app called CopStop to address issues of police violence in Oakland.

After the hackathon and his graduation from The Hidden Genius Project, Hofstetter received a two-year internship in the office of Oakland mayor Libby Schaaf.

Hofstetter founded his company at age 16 with the goal of helping other kids of color gain entry into the world of technology as innovators. He worked on a project for Capital One DevExchange to create a free mobile online curriculum, UpToCode Academy.

Hofstetter and fellow Hidden Genius alum Malik Poole were flown to Miami, Florida in October 2018 to speak at the Colin Kaepernick Know Your Rights Camp].

Hofstetter was featured in The Hidden Genius Project's Black History Month Pay it Forward Challenge  in March 2019. That fall, he travelled to South Africa to teach computer science and design thinking in the LEAP Science and Math Schools program.

In October 2019, he spoke at a TedxYouth event at the Seattle Academy of Arts and Sciences. His talk was entitled "How technology redefined can be a social justice super power."

George's most projects/events include the launch of a social networking app designed for education for a California-based non-profit Kingmakers of Oakland, being featured in the documentary, ‘Use of Force: The policing of Black America’ alongside Alicia Garza and Chuck D. Teaching the (in)Visible Designers series at Stanford University’s d.school and writing for the University of Oxford’s student paper The Oxford Blue after studying in a program the summer of 2022 at Worcester College in Oxford and Hughes Hall at the University of Cambridge.

References 

American motivational speakers